Haydée Martínez de Osorio is a Venezuelan United Nations official and a former Chairman of UNICEF (1983–1984). She was Director-General of the National Institute for Children in Venezuela and was formerly the UNICEF Area Representative for Argentina, Chile and Uruguay.

References

Venezuelan diplomats
Chairmen and Presidents of UNICEF
Venezuelan women diplomats
Living people
Year of birth missing (living people)
Place of birth missing (living people)
Venezuelan officials of the United Nations